Yevgeny Seryayev (born December 11, 1988) is a Russian speed-skater.

Seryayev competed at the 2014 Winter Olympics for Russia. He competed in the 10000 metres, finishing 9th.

Seryayev made his World Cup debut in November 2013. As of September 2014, his best World Cup finish is 8th, in a 5000m race at Inzell in 2013–14. His best overall finish in the World Cup is 15th, in the 2013–14 mass start.

References 

1988 births
Living people
Russian male speed skaters
Speed skaters at the 2014 Winter Olympics
Olympic speed skaters of Russia
Universiade medalists in speed skating
Speed skaters from Moscow
Universiade silver medalists for Russia
Competitors at the 2013 Winter Universiade